The Renault Argos was an open-top two-seater concept car created by Renault and was first shown at the 1994 Paris Motor Show. It was designed by Patrick Le Quément and was displayed purely as a design study with no performance figures issued.

Technical details
The Argos was powered by a Renault Twingo 1.2 L (1,239cc) 4-cylinder engine mated to an electronically controlled automatic transmission. The Argos had a weight of only , which is very light for an automobile. 

The structure and design of the car was quite innovative with such features as  doors that opened by sliding aft to nestle in the rear fenders, no superstructure, roof or even windscreen to interrupt the lines
and wing mirrors retract into front wings, and only deploy when engine is started.

References

Argos